John Alfred Spencer (6 July 1931 – 4 March 1996) was a New Zealand boat designer.

Biography
Spencer was born in Melbourne and moved to Eketahuna in 1933. He spent most of his life in New Zealand.

He was a well-known designer of sailing boats of all sizes, including the Cherub, Javelin (NZ), Firebug and Flying Ant classes of sailing dinghies. His designs used thin plywood, hard chines, a vertical stem and stern and light displacement.

Spencer's most famous design was arguably the 62-foot hard-chined Infidel, later known as Ragtime, which he designed and built for Tom Clark, a New Zealand industrialist. Ragtime was launched in late 1964 and went on to win the 1967 Auckland Class A Championship. Eventually sold to US owners, Ragtime won the 1973 and 1975 Honolulu Transpac Races, the 2008 Transpac Tahiti Race, and Division II of the 2008 Sydney to Hobart Yacht Race.

References

1931 births
1996 deaths
People from Melbourne
Australian emigrants to New Zealand
New Zealand yacht designers